Pleasures Magazine is a bi-monthly Pan-African entrepreneurship and lifestyles magazine. founded by Adedotun Babatunde Olaoluwa.

It was first launched in 2012 as weekly newspaper and re-branded in 2017 as a glossy magazine focuses on entrepreneurial success stories, luxury goods, fashion and events.

It is circulated in Nigeria, Ghana, South Africa, Kenya, United Arab Emirates, United States, and United Kingdom.

The magazine offices are located in Nigeria, Ghana and UAE

References 

2012 establishments in Nigeria
Bi-monthly magazines
Business magazines
English-language magazines
Lifestyle magazines
Magazines established in 2017
Magazines published in Nigeria
Publications established in 2012